Sascha Rothchild (born November 15, 1976) is an American writer.

Life
Rothchild grew up in Miami Beach, Florida and is one of three siblings. Her father, John Rothchild, is a well-known non-fiction writer and her mother, Susan Rothchild, is the daughter of 21 Club founder Charlie Berns.

She attended Boston College and graduated with honors in 1998. She then moved to Los Angeles and began her writing career. She lives in Los Angeles with her husband and two rescued boxer dogs.

Career
Rothchild was featured reading from her teen diary at the stage show, Mortified, on This American Life, My Experimental Phase episode. Her segment "Miami Vices" is on the This American Life best of CD, Hope and Fear. Rothchild was also featured on This American Life on Showtime, episode titled Growth Spurt.

Rothchild writes comedy feature films, scripted television, such as The Carrie Diaries, The Bold Type, Huge In France, GLOW and THE BABY SITTERS CLUB. She was also a regular blogger about relationships for Psychology Today Magazine and Huffington Post. Her LA Weekly article "How To Get Divorced By 30" about her failed starter marriage, spawned a memoir published by Penguin. Rothchild was a Co Executive Producer and writer for seasons 1, 2 and 3 on the hit Netflix series GLOW. She was nominated for an Emmy, Golden Globe, Writer's Guild Award, Producer's Guild Award for her work on GLOW.

Her debut novel, Blood Sugar, was published by Putnam in 2022.

Works
 How To Get Divorced By 30, Penguin, January 2010. 

 Blood Sugar, G.P. Putnam's Sons, April 2022.

References

External links
 
 "INTERVIEW WITH SASCHA ROTHCHILD: HOW TO GET DIVORCED BY 30: MY MISGUIDED ATTEMPT AT A STARTER MARRIAGE", Jen Schwartz, Divorce Candy FEB 04, 2010
"Q&A: Sascha Rothchild, author of How to Get Divorced by 30", Miami Herald, Connie Ogle, January 27, 2010
Q&A with Sascha Rothchild at the Powerhouse Arena, NY.
 Sascha Rothchild website
 This American Life (Radio)
 This American Life (book)
 This American Life (TV)
 Psychology Today Magazine
 The Penguin Group
 Penguin blog
 "Sascha Rothchild Enters the Ninja", Mortified,  January 2, 2008

Living people
1976 births
Writers from Miami
21st-century American women writers
Screenwriters from Florida
21st-century American screenwriters
Emmy Award winners